The Third Vienna Agreement was a bilateral agreement reached between Turkey and Cyprus over the Cyprus dispute in August 1975. The following issues were agreed upon:

 Turkish Cypriots residing in the southern part of the island would be able move north with their belongings.
 Greek Cypriots in the northern part of the island would be able to remain and be free from persecution.
 Greek Cypriots in the northern part would be able to move to the southern part of the island.
 The UNFICYP would have free and normal access to Greek Cypriot villages and habitations in the northern part of the island. 
 Priority would be given to the reunification of families.

References

External links
 The Third Vienna Agreement - August 1975

Cyprus dispute
International disputes